Dawn, officially Dawn – The Organization of Justice, Fairness and Democracy is an Icelandic political organization founded 18 March 2012 to participate in the 2013 parliamentary elections. It was founded as a merger between three political parties: The Movement, Citizens' Movement, and the Liberal Party. Its founders included two current MPs, Margrét Tryggvadóttir and Þór Saari, and two former members of the now defunct Icelandic Constitutional Assembly (Gísli Tryggvason and Lýður Árnason). Lýður Árnason withdrew his membership of the party a year after it was founded.

The movement derives its tradition from the protests during the financial crisis that started in 2008 ("Pots and Pans Revolution").

As of 8 January 2013, the party claimed to have reached 2,275 party members (equal to 1% of the electorate).

The party presented a deadline on 9 February 2013, for its party members to announce availability as potential candidates on the election list. Among those who in advance announced availability was Jón Jósef Bjarnason, a local councillor who had been elected for The Movement in the city Mosfellsbær. A special committee in the party was to convene and decide the order and listing of names for the party's candidate list.

Political program 

The political program of the party was published as its general "core strategy" on 18 March 2012. It comprises the following six points:
 Introduction of measures to support households: such as abolition of indexation of consumer loans (including mortgages) and generalized correction mortgage.
 New constitution: The party strongly supports passing the new constitution formulated by the constitutional assembly appointed by parliament in 2011.
 Composition of natural resources and the Fisheries Management: should be changed and reorganized. Exploitation of all natural resources and marine assets must be within sustainable limits, and the power company shall be public owned.
 Morality and transparency in political, administrative and financial systems: should be increased through enactment of new laws, which will set up new rules and procedures for code of conduct and surveillance mechanisms - along with an increase of the legal penalty for possible infringements.
 Legal justice and definite settlement of the financial crisis: establishment of a special prosecutor to judge and look into all cases related to the 2008–2011 Icelandic financial crisis, not only working with crime cases against business people, but also conducting a full public investigation of the roles played by the long-established political parties during the crisis. All Icelandic people should be allowed to refer a case to the special prosecutor, no matter his personal income or background.
 Relationship with EU: will support a democratic process with independent information and education provided for the Icelandic people, to make a well-informed decision at a referendum. If negotiations with EU can not be completed ahead of adoption of the recently planned new Icelandic constitution, and if the nation decides through a specific referendum to discontinue negotiations in accordance with article 66 of the new Constitutional Assembly bill, the party will then support such a conclusion. Article 66 in the newly proposed constitution declare, that a referendum shall be held within two years after a signed request (or bill proposal) on a subject with public interest has been submitted to Althingi by minimum 10% of the Icelandic electorate - in the event the Althingi can make a counter proposal. In this case the referendum shall take place with both proposals. If the EU negotiations can be completed ahead of adoption of the newly proposed constitution, the party will support that Iceland continue to follow the path where negotiations with the European Union first shall be completed, and then with a referendum to be held with a vote on the negotiated result.

Electoral results

Parliament

Dawn did not contest the 2021 Icelandic parliamentary election.

External links

References 

2012 establishments in Iceland
Political parties established in 2012
Political parties in Iceland